Mumbles is a headland in Swansea, Wales, United Kingdom. 

Mumbles may also refer to:

Places
 Mumbles (community), the local government community covering Mumbles, Swansea
 Mumbles (district), the area covering Mumbles, Swansea
 Mumbles, an electoral ward to the City and County of Swansea Council

Other uses
 Mumbles RFC, a rugby football club based in Mumbles, Swansea
 Mumbles, a Dick Tracy character
 "Mumbles", a 1960s jazz hit by Clark Terry
 Thomas Menino, American politician known as "Mumbles"

See also
 Mumble (disambiguation)